Fitzgerald County is one of the 141 Cadastral divisions of New South Wales.

Fitzgerald County was named in honour of the surveyor and botanist, Robert D. FitzGerald (1830-1892).

Parishes within this county
A full list of parishes found within this county; their current LGA and mapping coordinates to the approximate center of each location is as follows:

References

Counties of New South Wales